The Orange River is a tributary of the Caloosahatchee River. Orange River is a 8.7 mile stream.

References 

Rivers of Lee County, Florida
Rivers of Florida